Helotes is a city in Bexar County, Texas, United States, located on the far northwest side of San Antonio. It is part of the San Antonio-New Braunfels metropolitan statistical area. Its population was 9,030 at the 2020 census.

History

According to anthropologists, the area was occupied seasonally from about 5,000 BCE by small bands of nomadic Native American tribes in search of food and game. The Lipan Apache moved into the area in the late 17th century and occupied it throughout the 18th century. However, the Lipan were forced from the area in the early 1820s by the Comanche Indians.

A small farming and ranching community began to develop in the area shortly after the Texas Revolution in the late 1830s. The ranches suffered occasional attacks by the Comanches until the late 1870s.

In 1858, a Scottish immigrant, Dr. George Marnoch, purchased the land that later became the site of the town. Marnoch's home at one time served as a stagecoach stop and a post office for cowboys driving their cattle from Bandera to auction in San Antonio. His heirs sold a portion of their property in 1880 to a Swiss immigrant, Arnold Gugger, who built a home and mercantile store around which the town of Helotes arose. In 1908, Gugger sold his property to Bert Hileman, who opened the town's first dance hall. He was also instrumental in getting old Bandera Road paved and opening the town's first filling station. He sold his property in downtown Helotes in 1919, when the town's population declined.

In 1946, the manager of San Antonio's Majestic Theatre, John T. Floore, opened the landmark John T. Floore Country Store, which is actually a dance hall (or "honky tonk") that draws top country music talent, including Willie Nelson, who still plays the venue on occasion. Floore also financed the first annual Helotes Cornyval festival in the 1960s, which was held to celebrate the opening of a new post office.

Corn played an important role in the heritage of Helotes. The local Native Americans planted corn (maize outside the US) in the fertile valleys of the area, and feed corn was a major crop grown in the 19th and early 20th centuries. The town name is derived from the Spanish word elote, which can mean "ear of maize", "corncob", or simply "corn", but exactly how the town came to be called Helotes is still a subject of debate.

As the urban sprawl of San Antonio expanded and approached the outskirts of Helotes in the 1970s. After a decade of planning and negotiation, Helotes became an incorporated city in October 1981. To this day, residents struggle with the dilemma of maintaining the city's rugged country charm, while at the same time allowing for the development of modern suburban facilities and businesses. Helotes was the hometown of the late Texas State Senator Frank L. Madla, who died after his home on the south side of San Antonio caught fire on November 24, 2006.

1953 tornado
Two people were killed and 15 others were injured.

Overview

When Helotes incorporated in 1981,  very little was in the town. Now with a population over 7,000, Helotes is becoming one of the most desirable suburbs of San Antonio. Helotes itself includes the newly renovated Old Town Helotes. Completed in 2011, Old Town Helotes is the revitalized downtown, which includes John T. Floore's Country Store, All That Glitters, L&M Feed and Supply, Mander Automotive Service, First Baptist Church of Helotes, Elf Hardware, Helotes Tactical Firearms, Helotes Creek Winery, and El Chaparral Mexican Restaurant. Helotes is home to Oak Valley golf course, the first golf course in South Texas to be fully lit at night. The Morales family built the golf course on their vast acres of land acquired by Lorenzo Morales, a pillar of the community. He was extremely influential in settling Helotes.

The Cornyval Festival is an annual city tradition bringing in local vendors and thousands of area residents to celebrate the namesake of the town.

Geography
Helotes is located in northwestern Bexar County in the valley of Helotes Creek where it exits from the Texas Hill Country. Texas State Highway 16 runs through the community, leading northwest  to Bandera.

Demographics

As of the 2020 United States census, there were 9,030 people, 2,837 households, and 2,467 families residing in the city. The population density was 1,014.3 people per square mile (392.0/km). The 1,525 housing units averaged 361.0 per square mile (139.5/km). Of the 2,837 households, 40.2% had children under the age of 18, 79.9% were married couples living together, and 12.2% were not families. About 10.6% of all households were made up of individuals, and 4.5% had someone living alone who was 65 years of age or older. The average household size was 2.91 persons, and the average family size was 3.13 persons.

The population was distributed as 26.8% under the age of 18, 5.5% from 18 to 24, 29.3% from 25 to 44, 27.6% from 45 to 64, and 10.8% who were 65 years of age or older. The median age was 39 years. For every 100 females, there were 96.6 males. For every 100 females age 18 and over, there were 96.1 males.

The median income for a household in the city was $76,951, and for a family was $80,090. Males had a median income of $50,625 versus $38,362 for females. The per capita income for the city was $29,534. About 2.0% of families and 2.0% of the population were below the poverty line including 2.4% of those under the age of 18 years and 2.9% of the age of 65 years or older.

Education
Helotes residents are zoned to the following schools in the Northside Independent School District:

Elementary schools: 
 Charles L. Kuentz, Jr. Elementary School (Helotes)
 Helotes Elementary School (Helotes)
 Los Reyes Elementary School (Helotes)
 Randall H. Fields Elementary School (San Antonio)

Middle schools: 
 Dr. Hector P. Garcia Middle School (San Antonio)
 Wallace B. Jefferson Middle School (San Antonio)
 Dr. John Folks Middle School (San Antonio)

High schools:
 Sandra Day O'Connor High School (Helotes)
 Louis Dembitz Brandeis High School (San Antonio)
 John Marshall Harlan High School (San Antonio)

Notable people

 Phil Gramm, former US. Senator and US Congressman Texas 6th District
 Will Hurd, U.S. congressman
 Boone Logan, former MLB player
 Brucene Smith, Miss World USA 1971 and Miss International 1974
 Carlos Uresti, attorney and Democratic politician from San Antonio, Texas

References

External links

 City of Helotes official website
 Helotes, Texas in the Handbook of Texas Online

Cities in Bexar County, Texas
Cities in Texas
Greater San Antonio
New Braunfels, Texas
Populated places established in 1880
1880 establishments in Texas